Brzustów  is a village in the administrative district of Gmina Inowłódz, within Tomaszów Mazowiecki County, Łódź Voivodeship, in central Poland.

The village has a population of 950.

References

Brzustów | Strony o Brzustowie - a website (in Polish)

Villages in Tomaszów Mazowiecki County